Sara Agnes Mclaughlin Conboy (April 3, 1870 – January 7, 1928) was a labor organizer in the United States.

She was born Sara Agnes Mclaughlin in Boston, Massachusetts. At the age of 11 she began working in a candy factory, then spent time in a button factory before becoming a skilled weaver. During this period she was married to a mailman named Joseph P. Conboy, but he died two years afterward. While working at a carpet factory in Roxbury, she led
a strike that lasted from 1909–10.

Rising to prominence in the labor movement, Sara helped organize the United Textile Workers of America, eventually becoming their secretary-treasurer in 1915.  During World War I she was appointed to the Council of National Defense. In 1920 she was the first woman to serve as a United States delegate to the British Trades Union Congress. She was also the first woman to direct a bank in the state of New York, and she served on several government committees.

References

1870 births
1928 deaths
Workers' rights activists
American weavers
Activists from Boston
Women textile artists
Trade unionists from Massachusetts
American women trade unionists
Leaders of the United Textile Workers of America